Bolestraszyce  is a village in the administrative district of Gmina Żurawica, within Przemyśl County, Subcarpathian Voivodeship, in south-eastern Poland.

The village has a population of 1,700.

Nearby is the Bolestraszyce Arboretum.

References

Bolestraszyce